This is a list of the National Register of Historic Places listings in Madison, Wisconsin.

This is intended to be a complete list of the properties and districts on the National Register of Historic Places in Madison, Wisconsin, United States. Latitude and longitude coordinates are provided for many National Register properties and districts; these locations may be seen together in an online map.

There are 255 properties and districts listed on the National Register in Dane County, including 11 National Historic Landmarks. The city of Madison is the location of 154 of these properties and districts, including 8 of the National Historic Landmarks; they are listed here, while the remaining properties and districts are listed separately.

Current listings

|}

See also 
 List of National Historic Landmarks in Wisconsin
 National Register of Historic Places listings in Dane County, Wisconsin
 National Register of Historic Places listings in Wisconsin
 Wisconsin Historical Society

References

External links 
 Historic Madison, Inc.
 Madison Landmarks Commission
 Madison Trust for Historic Preservation

 
Madison
Madison, Wisconsin